Hyundai and Kia utilized several iterations of platforms for their small automobile line-up since 1997.

FF platform 
The FF platform is the first city car platform developed by Hyundai for its first A-segment city car, the Hyundai Atos. Introduced in 1997, production continued until 2014, when the Hyundai Santro Xing was discontinued. 
 Hyundai Atos/Atoz (FF) (1997–2007)
 Hyundai Atos/Atoz/Santro/Amica/Kia Visto (MX) (1998–2014)

SA platform 
The SA platform is a successor of the FF platform, mainly utilized for A-segment vehicles starting from 2004. The platform was derived as a shortened version of the TB platform. 
Hyundai Eon (HA) (2011–2019)
 Hyundai i10 (PA) (2007–2014)
 Kia Picanto/Morning (SA) (2004–2011)
Kia Picanto/Morning (TA) (2011–2017)
Kia Ray (TAM) (2012–present)

BA platform 
The BA platform is a successor of the SA platform, mainly utilized for A-segment vehicles starting from 2014.

 Hyundai i10 (IA) (2014–2019)
 Hyundai Grand i10 (BA) (2014–2019)
 Hyundai i10 (AC3) (2019–present)
 Hyundai Xcent/Grand i10 sedan (BA) (2014–present)
 Kia Picanto/Morning (JA) (2017–present)

TB platform 
 Hyundai Accent/Verna (LC) (1999–2005)
 Hyundai Getz/Click (TB) (2002–2011)

JB platform 
The JB platform is a successor of the TB platform, mainly utilized for B-segment vehicles starting from 2005.
 Hyundai Accent/Verna (MC) (2005–2011)
 Kia Rio/Pride (JB) (2005–2011)

PB platform 
The PB platform is a successor of the JB platform, mainly utilized for B-segment vehicles starting from 2010.
Hyundai Accent/Verna/Solaris (RB) (2010–2017)
Hyundai Creta/ix25 (GS) (2015–present)
Hyundai HB20 (HB) (2012–2019)
Hyundai HB20 (BR2) (2019–present)
Hyundai i20 (PB) (2008–2014)
Hyundai i20 (IB) (2014–2020)
Hyundai ix20 (JC) (2010–2019)
Hyundai Reina (CB) (2017–present)
Hyundai Veloster (FS) (2011–2019)
Kia KX3 (KC) (2015–2019)
Kia Pegas/Soluto (AB) (2017–present)
 Kia Rio/K2 (QB) (2011–2017)
 Kia Rio/Pride (UB) (2011–2017)
Kia Soul (AM) (2009–2014)
Kia Venga (YN) (2009–2019)

GB platform 
The GB platform is a successor of the PB platform, mainly utilized for B-segment vehicles. It is succeeded by the K2 platform.
 Hyundai i20 (GB) (2014–2020)
 Kia Rio (YB) (2017–present)
 Kia Soul (SK3) (2018–present)
Kia Stonic/KX1 (YB CUV) (2018–present)

B-SUV platform (2017) 
The all-new B-SUV platform debuted with the Hyundai Kona in 2017. The all-new platform is said to be based on the Hyundai i30 platform, and is claimed to extensively using advanced high-strength steel. The architecture supports electrified variants, and unlike the GB platform, the new platform supports an all-wheel-drive drivetrain with dual-arm multi-link independent rear suspension.

 Hyundai Kona (OS) (2017–present)
 Kia Seltos (SP2) (2019–present)

References 

small automobile platforms